James Crawford (born April 13, 1960) is an American former professional basketball player who played in the Australian National Basketball League from 1982 to 2003.

School
Crawford was born in Lower Peach Tree, Alabama, and attended Pine Hill High School in Pine Hill, Alabama. Prior to coming to Australia in 1981, Crawford attended Livingston University and Cumberland College in Kentucky.

Professional career
During his NBL career, the "Alabama Slamma" played for the Geelong Supercats (1982–1985), the Canberra Cannons (1986, 2003) and the Perth Wildcats (1987–1999). He played in a total of 504 NBL games, 371 of them for the Wildcats and currently sits third on the list of all time NBL scorers with 11,121 points, scoring at an average of 22.1 per game. He also sits third on the NBL all-time rebound list (behind only Mark Bradtke and Mark Davis) with 4,794 (9.5 per game) and second in blocked shots with 788 (1.5 per game).

Crawford, who at 6'8" (203 cm) was a power forward or centre, was an integral part of the Perth Wildcats three NBL Championships during the 1990s (1990, 1991 and 1995) combining with teammates Kendal "Tiny" Pinder, Ricky Grace, Mike Ellis, Andrew Vlahov and playing coach Cal Bruton to be part of the most successful team of the decade. He was also selected to the NBL's All-First Team four times (1982, 1983, 1984 and 1987) and was selected to the NBL's 20th Anniversary Team in 1998 and the NBL's 25th Anniversary Team in 2004. In addition, Crawford was also often an automatic selection to the NBL All-Star Game due to his outstanding play.

Despite retiring due to injury in 1999, Crawford suited up in one more NBL match for the Canberra Cannons in the 2002–03 NBL season.

In 2013, Crawford returned to Perth for the Wildcats' 30th Anniversary Legends Game.

On February 4, 2013, Crawford was named in the Perth Wildcats 30th Anniversary All-Star team.

In November 2013, he was inducted into the Australian Basketball Hall of Fame.

Honour roll

NBL career stats

Trivia
His #7 jersey is one of six jerseys that have been retired by the Wildcats and is displayed at Perth Arena during Wildcats home games.

References

1960 births
Living people
African-American basketball players
American expatriate basketball people in Australia
American men's basketball players
Basketball players from Alabama
Canberra Cannons players
Centers (basketball)
Cumberlands Patriots men's basketball players
Geelong Supercats players
Junior college men's basketball players in the United States
People from Wilcox County, Alabama
Perth Wildcats players
Power forwards (basketball)
West Alabama Tigers men's basketball players
21st-century African-American people
20th-century African-American sportspeople